Ministry of Interior in the Republic of Tatarstan (Tatar: Татарстан Республикасы буенча Эчке эшләр министрлыгы; Russian: МВД по Республике Татарстан) is the main police authority in Tatarstan, central Russia. In March 2012, the current minister is Artyom Khokhorin.

The Ministry of Interior of the Republic of Tatarstan works in accordance with the clause about Ministry of Interior of the Republic of Tatarstan confirmed by the Order of Ministry of Interior of Russia dated 05.12.2006 № 981 “Confirmation of the Clause about Ministry of Interior of the Republic of Tatarstan”.

Headquarters: 420111, Kazan, 19 Dzerzhinsky street.

Main functions
 Ensuring of protection of the human rights and freedom
 Organization of prevention, reveal, suppression and investigation of crime, prevention and suppression of administrative delinquency
 Ensuring of public order protection in Tatarstan
 Ensuring of road safety in Tatarstan
 Organization and control for turnover of civil and staff weapon, explosives in Tatarstan
 Organization and control for non-governmental (private) security and detective work in Tatarstan
 Organization of property protection of physical and juridical parties by the agreements
 Management of subordinate interior bodies, subdivisions and organizations

External links
official homepage
New Website

Politics of Tatarstan
Tatarstan
Tatarstan